Mosque of Al-Fadeekh, or Asy-Syams Mosque, is a mosque formerly used by the Islamic prophet Muhammad and his Sahabahs for prayer when they were surrounded by their enemies, and later it was named as Mosque of Bani Nadhir. On the other hand, it is said that Ayah that prohibits khamr (alcohol) was descended here, and Muslims then spilled the alcohol here. Considering the importance of this religious event, which is dealing with the obedience to the religious orders, the mosque was later renamed as Al-Fadeekh, which means a drink made by date palms before being cooked.

The mosque is located in Wadi Mudzainab in the center of Medina, more or less 3.5 km from Al-Masjid an-Nabawi or 1 km from Quba Mosque.

See also

 List of mosques in Saudi Arabia
 Lists of mosques 
 List of mosques in Medina

References 

Fadeekh